The Biography Channel (also known as Bio.) was a British general entertainment channel available in some European countries. The channel was launched on 1 October 2000 by a joint-venture between A+E Networks and British Sky Broadcasting in the United Kingdom. It later became available in Ireland, the Netherlands and Belgium. The channel's programming, as the name suggests, is made up of the biographies of famous people, including bands, politicians and criminals. The channel ceased broadcasting at 6 am on 4 November 2013 and was replaced by Lifetime.

Availability
In the United Kingdom the channel was available on Sky, Smallworld Cable and Virgin Media. In Ireland it was available on Sky and UPC Ireland. In Belgium it was available on Telenet.

Bio. HD
A high definition version launched on Sky on 5 November 2008, it was also available on Virgin Media Ireland from October 2009. Bio. HD operated on a separate schedule to the standard definition channel and timeshared with CI HD. The channel closed on 3 July 2012 to allow CI HD to broadcast 24 hours a day.

See also
 FYI (U.S. TV channel)
 The Biography Channel (Canada)
 Bio (Australian TV channel)

References

External links

Biography Channel, The
Television channels and stations established in 2000
Television channels and stations disestablished in 2013
 UK
Sky television channels
2000 establishments in the United Kingdom
2013 disestablishments in the United Kingdom
Defunct television channels in the United Kingdom
Television channel articles with incorrect naming style